The 2010 FIM PGE Polska Grupa Energetyczna Speedway World Cup (SWC) was the tenth FIM Speedway World Cup, the annual international speedway world championship tournament. It was originally scheduled to take place between 24 July and 31 July 2010, although re-stagings due to adverse weather meant that it finally took place between 25 July and 1 August, and involved eight national teams. Six teams were seeded through to the finals and two qualification rounds were held in May 2010 to determine the final two places.

Poland won the World Cup for the fourth time in six seasons, amassing 44 points in the final. Denmark finished second with 39, while Sweden finished third for the third successive year, with 35 points.

Qualification

Qualified teams

Tournament

Final classification

See also
 2010 Speedway Grand Prix
 2010 Team Speedway Junior World Championship

References

External links
 SpeedwayWorld.tv (SWC news)

 
World Team
2010